is a city in the eastern part of Toyama Prefecture, Japan. , the city had an estimated population of 42,224 in 16,811 households and a population density of 210 persons per km².

Geography
Uozu lies in between Namerikawa and Kurobe, stretching from Toyama Bay and the Sea of Japan in the northwest to tall mountain ranges in the southeast. The highest mountains in Uozu are Sougadake and Kekachiyama, and the highest elevation in Uozu is 2,414 m. Several rapid rivers run through Uozu; from east to west, they are the Fuse River, the Katakai River, the Kado River, and the Hayatsuki River. Much of the area is a dispersed settlement typical of this region of Japan.

Surrounding municipalities
Toyama Prefecture
 Kurobe
 Namerikawa
 Kamiichi

Climate
Uozu has a humid continental climate (Köppen Cfa) characterized by mild summers and cold winters with heavy snowfall.  The average annual temperature in Uozu is 13.7 °C. The average annual rainfall is 2278 mm with September as the wettest month. The temperatures are highest on average in August, at around 26.3 °C, and lowest in January, at around 2.4 °C.

Demographics
Per Japanese census data, the population of Uozu has declined in recent decades.

History

The area of present-day Uotsu was part of ancient Etchū Province and has been inhabited since at least the Jōmon period. Discovery of gold in the mountains of Uozu around 1394 led to an influx of people, making the area around Matsukura Castle a center for the region. Later, when Matsukura Castle was destroyed, the center was reestablished around Uozu Castle close to the sea. In 1582, the Siege of Uozu occurred between forces allied to the Uesugi clan, and forces under Oda Nobunaga. Uozu Castle was captured by Oda forces only three days before Oda's assassination at the Honnō-ji incident.

Under the Edo period Tokugawa shogunate, Uozu was part of Kaga Domain ruled by the Maeda clan. The modern town of Uozu was established with the establishment of the municipalities system on 1 April 1889. The Taisho rice riots of 1918 began at Uozu before spreading across the country. Most of the western portion of the town was destroyed in a fire in 1943, but the town escaped damage in World War II. Uozu was raised to city status on 1 April 1952. In September 1956, a great fire ravished many buildings in Uozu.

Government
Uozu has a mayor-council form of government with a directly elected mayor and a unicameral city legislature of 18 members.

Education
Uozu has ten public elementary schools and two public junior high schools operated by the town government, and three public high schools operated by the Toyama Prefectural Board of Education. There is also one private high school.

Transportation
Uozu is located 3 hours by rail and 4.5 hours by car from Tokyo. Since March 2015, rail access is possible via Hokuriku Shinkansen high-speed train from nearby rail hub of Toyama. Uozu is served by two passenger train lines, the Toyama Chihō Railway Main Line and the Ainokaze Toyama Railway line, running together from Uozu Station westward and separating eastward.

Railway
 Ainokaze Toyama Railway
 
 Toyama Chihō Railway
  –  –  –

Highway
Hokuriku Expressway

Sister City relations
 Chiang Mai, Thailand, since 8 August 1989

Notable people from Uozu, Toyama
 Kaori Sadohara, Japanese voice actress and singer
 Ayumu Ishikawa, Japanese professional baseball pitcher (Chiba Lotte Marines, Nippon Professional Baseball – Pacific League)
 Takashi Rakuyama, Japanese former football player
 Akira Shoji, Japanese former mixed martial artist and professional wrestler
 Akihiro Murata, Japanese professional shogi player ranked 6-dan
 Kōsuke Tamura, Japanese professional shogi player ranked 7-dan

Local attractions

Uozu's Three Mysteries

Mirages
The waters of Toyama Bay are noted for mirages, especially during spring and winter. The spring mirage for which Uozu is famous for may be seen on warm, sunny, windless days from April to June. The Mirage Land Amusement Park (ミラージュランド) with its large Ferris wheel is a popular location for observation of the phenomena.

Firefly Squid
In the early morning hours, from the end of March to the beginning of June, female  rise to the surface to spawn. Their name comes from a bluish white glow which emanates from various points on their bodies.

The Buried Forest
Approximately 2000 years ago, a primeval sugi (Cryptomeria) forest along the coast was partially buried so that only the trunks were preserved. The area is a National Natural Monument, and there is a museum in Uotsu where examples can be seen.

Other 
Other sightseeing destinations in Uozu include the Uozu Aquarium, Kintaro Hot Springs (金太郎温泉), Ariso Dome Gymnasium, Niikawa Culture Hall, the Uozu Historical Folk Museum, Lake Ikejiri, Hirazawa Waterfalls and site of Matsukura Castle.

References

External links

  

 
Cities in Toyama Prefecture
Populated coastal places in Japan